The Honda Logo  is a B-segment supermini manufactured and marketed by Honda from 1996 to 2001, as a three door and five door hatchback, sharing its platform with the Honda Capa and replacing the second generation Honda City. The Logo was larger than the kei class Honda Life, smaller than the subcompact Honda Civic, and was superseded by the Honda Fit.

It was marketed in Japan through dealerships of Honda Clio from 1996 to 2001, and briefly in the United Kingdom between 2000 and 2001. The Logo was an effort by Honda to repeat the success of early Civic, with its length, width, and engine size almost matching the first generation Civic.

Mechanicals
The Logo used the D13B, initially with two valves per cylinder, subsequently upgraded to four valves. A CVT transmission was offered. The engine provided . Minor changes in later grades sport "TS", sixteen valve type specification in D13B (SOHC 1.3L PGM spec FI) were also later introduced.

Transmissions included a five-speed manual transmission, three-speed automatic transmission, and the CVT, marketed as Honda Multimatic.

Sales
In Japan, the Logo succeeded the second generation series of Honda City, GA1 and 2. Two models were derived using the platforms and components: the Honda Capa and the first generation Honda HR-V which had much more emphasis on a youthful approach, but the Logo was meant to remain practical and economical and sales reflected the modest intent of the Logo, and the car didn't sell as well as hoped. 

From the lessons learned from the Logo, the Honda Fit that followed in 2001 was successful to renew the basic concepts, combining fun to drive with great packaging, and less so on making an economical and practical car. In Europe, sales were not particularly strong, but the car did come top of a customer satisfaction survey in December 2001.

A number of second hand Logos - originally sold new in Japan - were shipped to New Zealand in the 2000s and were a popular 'used import' buy for several years.

Safety
The Logo was tested by Euro NCAP in 2000. It received a score of 17 for an adult occupant, and a score of 14 in the pedestrian test.

Chronology
 1996: October 3, was announced as the successor to the City. Slogan is "human sized". 
 1997: September 12, have made minor changes. Set the steering wheel with all types of antimicrobial.
 1997: December 15, of the same color body color bumpers, special edition models such as the side mirrors set "Classic" was set up.
 1998: April 23, and appeared as a car derived capacity.
 1998: September 22, to, HR derived as a car V (three door) appeared.
 1998: November 12, Minor model change. Automobile exhaust gas regulations to improve the safety and responding to conflict, GF design changes were made in which the front GA3/5. For improved crashworthiness, considerable changes have been made from rigid body to review such a full model change. Also "TS" Sport grade that (with the engine specifications 16Valve), and four wheel drive specification Realtime 4WD and in combination with the Honda Multimatic S was added.
 1999: September, 21Sport grade "TS" special edition models with improved texture of the interior and exterior based on "Sports ROOT" were set. Also a special color "Super Sonic Blue Pearl" were set.
 1999: December 16, basic grade "G" special edition models, such as body color bumpers with the same color based on "Claris" were set. Also a special color "Silver Crystal" were set.
 2000: April 13, have made minor changes. Further improved collision safety grill increases further. Format is the same name. "Rutikku Sports' Deals of the specification set.
 2000: November 30, basic grade "G" keyless entry system, based on adding and remote control door mirrors retractable electric body same color, good deals cheaper 50,000 yen from the car based special edition models "Topics" were set.
 2001: The successor vehicle, the Honda Fit, is launched, and the Logo is discontinued.

See also
 Honda Capa

References

Logo
Euro NCAP superminis
Cars introduced in 1996
Vehicles with CVT transmission
All-wheel-drive vehicles
2000s cars